Victory Noll–St. Felix Friary Historic District is a historic Roman Catholic friary and national historic district located at Huntington, Huntington County, Indiana. The district encompasses 10 contributing buildings, 5 contributing sites, 4 contributing structures, and 3 contributing objects.  While the friary was sold in 1980 to the Good Shepherd Church of the United Brethren in Christ, in 2010 John Tippman bought back the friary and donated it back to the Catholic Church. The friary is currently undergoing restorations.

It was listed on the National Register of Historic Places in 2004.

References

Historic districts on the National Register of Historic Places in Indiana
Properties of religious function on the National Register of Historic Places in Indiana
Renaissance Revival architecture in Indiana
Mission Revival architecture in Indiana
Churches completed in 1925
Churches in Huntington County, Indiana
Historic districts in Huntington County, Indiana
National Register of Historic Places in Huntington County, Indiana